Olkhovsky is a rural locality (a khutor) in Dubovskoye Rural Settlement, Uryupinsky District, Volgograd Oblast, Russia. The population was 106 as of 2010.

Geography 
The village is located in steppe, 24 km from Uryupinsk and 360 km from Volgograd.

References 

Rural localities in Uryupinsky District